John Casimer "Turk" Yezerski (September 22, 1913 – January 18, 1979), sometimes spelled Jezierski, was an American football player.

Yezerski was born in 1914 in Portland, Oregon, and attended Portland's Washington High School.  

He played college football for the Saint Mary's Gaels football team in 1933 to 1934.  He was selected by the Newspaper Enterprise Association (NEA) as a first-team tackle on the 1933 College Football All-America Team. He was dropped from the football team in January 1935 due to scholastic deficiencies.

He also played professional football as a tackle in the National Football League for the Brooklyn Dodgers in 1936. He appeared in nine games for the Dodgers.

Yezerski died in 1979 in Boring, Oregon.

References

1913 births
1979 deaths
American football tackles
Brooklyn Dodgers (NFL) players
Saint Mary's Gaels football players
Players of American football from Portland, Oregon
Washington High School (Portland, Oregon) alumni